So This Is Love is a soulful house track by FSOL under the moniker Mental Cube. Recorded in 1991, it was also featured on the Earthbeat compilation album of the following year.

Track listing
 So This Is Love (4:50) 
 So This Is Love (Neo Neo) (4:00) 
 Q (Santa Monica Mix) (4:10)

Crew
Artwork By Buggy G. Riphead 
Executive Producer - T. Jones 
Producer - Future Sound Of London, The 
Written By B. Dougans/G. Cobain 
Written By B. Dougans, G. Cobain

References

External links
 

1991 songs
The Future Sound of London songs